Soisy-sous-Montmorency (literally Soisy under Montmorency) is a commune in the Val-d'Oise département located  north of Paris, France.

History
On 7 August 1850, a part of the territory of Soisy-sous-Montmorency was detached and merged with a part of the territory of Saint-Gratien, a part of the territory of Deuil-la-Barre, and a part of the territory of Épinay-sur-Seine to create the commune of Enghien-les-Bains.

Population

Sport
 Racecourse: Hippodrome d'Enghien-Soisy
 Sports stadium: Stade Albert Schweitzer home of the FC Soisy-Andilly-Margency.

Transport
Soisy-sous-Montmorency is served by Champ de courses d'Enghien station on the SNCF Transilien Paris – Nord suburban rail line.

Notable people
 Aristide Briand (1862–1932), statesman
 Ida Presti (1924–1967), classical guitarist and composer
 Georges Delerue (1925–1992), composer
 Alexandre Lagoya (1929–1999), classical guitarist
 Christian Noyer (b. 1950), economist
 Yann LeCun (b. 1960), American artificial intelligence researcher
 Emmanuel Renaut (b. 1968), chef (born in Soisy)
 Christophe Agnolutto (b. 1969), professional road bicycle racer (born in Soisy)
 Louis Saha (b. 1978), professional footballer (FC Soisy-Andilly-Margency)
 Ludwig Briand (b. 1981), actor (born in Soisy)
 Soilhyo Mété (b. 1988), Ivorian professional footballer
 Roxane Fournier (b. 1991), racing cyclist (born in Soisy)
 Thibault Rossard (b. 1993), volleyball player (born in Soisy)
 Alan Virginius (b. 2003) professional footballer (born in Soisy)

Gallery

See also
Montmorency
Communes of the Val-d'Oise department

References
Association of Mayors of the Val d'Oise

External links

Official website 

Communes of Val-d'Oise